Churchill is a census-designated place (CDP) in Gallatin County, Montana, United States. The population was 902 at the 2010 census. It is part of the Bozeman, MT Micropolitan Statistical Area. It was formerly part of the Amsterdam-Churchill CDP.

Geography
Churchill is located at  (45.749951, -111.310256).

History

Church Hill, or Churchill as it was later shortened by Gallatin County Road Department, is located seven miles south of Manhattan, just to east of Amsterdam on a prominent hill. Churchill is at the center of the Montana's largest Dutch settlement that runs from Manhattan south to Little Holland which is 14 miles distant. While Amsterdam may have been the retail center of the Dutch settlement, Churchill was the cultural center with the site of the Dutch community's original church- the 1st Christian Reformed Church, today known as Manhattan Christian Reformed Church; and related parent-operated private P-12 school, Manhattan Christian School; both of which exist today along with Bethel Christian Reformed Church (a spin off of the original church) and Churchill Retirement Home. The large church on the hill is the probable origin of the name, and once was the largest wooden structure west of the Mississippi River. In the late 1890s, Dutch immigrants came to the Gallatin Valley, with the aid of the Manhattan Malting Company, and created a "linear settlement" of homes, farms, and ranches that stretched roughly 14 miles south of Manhattan, with Amsterdam and Churchill roughly in the middle. Recognizing the growth of the community, the Northern Pacific designated a siding called Amsterdam to the west of "the hill" along its Anceney Spur; not to be outdone, the C.M. & St. Paul Railway (aka:the Milwaukee Road) created a siding for agricultural goods about two miles to the east of Churchill along its Gallatin Valley Railway called the "Holland Siding", subsequently the "east of the hill" became known on maps as Holland. Seven miles to the south of Churchill, near an area where many Dutch settlers homesteaded, is an area called "Little Holland" and today is marked by one of the two cemeteries established by the original Dutch settlers, while the other cemetery is located in Churchill.

Education
Manhattan Christian School is a private school in Churchill. It is a Class C school.

Demographics

References

External links
 Gallatin County Emergency Management

Census-designated places in Gallatin County, Montana
Census-designated places in Montana